Thornton Tomasetti (formerly the Thornton-Tomasetti Group, Thornton Tomasetti Engineers, Lev Zetlin & Associates, LZA Technology and Weidlinger Associates) is a global, 1,500-plus person scientific and engineering consulting firm.

Services 
Thornton Tomasetti has expertise in structural engineering, facade engineering, forensic engineering, structural renovations, construction engineering, Resilience (engineering and construction), sustainable design, applied science, protective design and security, civil engineering and bridge design and rehabilitation. The firm's services are supported by its internal research and development CORE teams, which provides technology-focused expertise, computational simulation and software development as well as artificial intelligence and machine learning.

The firm provides consulting expertise to clients in a variety of industries, including architecture/engineering/construction, insurance and law firms, real estate developers, building owners/operators, defense, life sciences, manufacturing, natural resources and space systems.

History 

1949—Paul Weidlinger opens consultancy: Weidlinger Associates dates back to 1949 with the launch of Paul Weidlinger Consulting Engineers in Washington, D.C. A native of Budapest, Hungary, Paul earned a master's degree from the ETH Zurich in Zurich. He apprenticed with Le Corbusier in Paris and László Moholy-Nagy in London before coming to the United States in the late 1940s.

1950s—Applied Science division launched: Paul Weidlinger, Dr. Mario Salvadori and Dr. Melvin Baron shared an interest in the dynamic response of structures, which led the firm to create an Applied Science division. The group developed analysis and design procedures to protect structures from the effects of blast loadings. Their methods led to early and continuing use of computers in advanced analysis and design.

1956—Lev Zetlin starts Lev Zetlin Associates: After earning a doctoral degree from New York’s Cornell University, Lev Zetlin decided to start his own company, Lev Zetlin Associates (LZA).

1960—Charlie Thornton joins LZA: Charlie Thornton, who earned master’s and doctoral degrees from New York University and authored a thesis on cable nets, joined Lev Zetlin Associates in 1960. Serving as co-chairman of the firm until 2004, he was involved in the analysis, design and construction of projects worldwide.

1964 -- 1964 New York World’s Fair (Flushing Meadows, New York): Early in his career, Lev Zetlin devised a “double-layer bicycle wheel” roof system. The system combines upper and lower cables with varying tensions that are jacked apart and connected by rigid vertical struts. Connecting cables that have differing natural frequencies minimizes wind-induced fluttering. First developed for the Utica Memorial Auditorium, which was completed in 1960, Lev Zetlin's bicycle wheel system has helped to shape the design of other tensile structures, among them the New York State Pavilion, Madison Square Garden, the Seoul Olympic Gymnastics Arena, Tropicana Field, and the Georgia Dome.

1968—Richard Tomasetti joins LZA: Richard Tomasetti joined Lev Zetlin Associates after working in the aerospace and submarine industries. Tomasetti created Environspace Research and Development, the firm’s first research and development group.

1977—Charlie Thornton and Richard Tomasetti buy LZA from Gable Industries: Charlie Thornton and Richard Tomasetti purchased Lev Zetlin Associates while it was a subsidiary of Gable Industries. It was at this time that the firm began performing some work as Thornton Tomasetti. The firm's name changed officially from the TTG Group to Thornton Tomasetti in 1999.

1980s-1990s—FLEX code introduced: The FLEX code was first developed by Weidlinger in the early 1980s to support Nuclear Test Ban Treaty monitoring. Its name is derived from its primary focus, performing ”fast large explicit’ time-domain dynamic simulations, and from its versatility and speed in modeling unusually large structures. In the early 1990s, the FLEX code was diversified into a family: NLFlex (blast), EMFlex (electromagnetic waves), and PZFlex (sonar and ultrasound). In 1999, SpectralFlex was developed to serve the growing field of medical therapeutics, and in 2002, Weidlinger created the FLEX Template System, for modeling and simulation of structural components of civilian structures subjected to bomb blasts.

2001—World Trade Center collapse (New York, New York): In the 10 months after the September 11 attacks, crews removed more than 1.6 million tons of debris. Thornton Tomasetti staff were the first engineers on the site on September 11, and started work that afternoon. The firm supervised 20 member firms of the Structural Engineers Association of New York and arranged for 24/7 coverage of the site for nine months. The firm assisted in rescue, demolition and clean-up, advising on structural issues that required resolution as part of the recovery effort.

2004—Taipei 101 (Taipei, Taiwan) Completed: The first 21st-century building to become the world’s tallest upon completion, Taipei 101 is, as its name implies, a 101-story tower. Working with engineer of record Evergreen Consulting, Thornton Tomasetti established an efficient steel-based dual structural system and solved wind behavior problems with distinctive double stair-step corners. By 2020, Thornton Tomasetti had designed five of the 20 tallest complete buildings in the world.

2011 – CORE studio founded: CORE studio is the firm's internal research and development group that specializes in application development, computational modeling and artificial intelligence to create efficiencies in the structural design and construction process.

2012—Response to Hurricane Sandy: On October 29, 2012, Hurricane Sandy made landfall near Atlantic City, New Jersey. In response, the firm conducted damage assessment in three states related to structural and architectural integrity, HVAC, electrical, plumbing and fire protection equipment and systems. Included in the investigations were high-rise office and residential facilities, and other retail, rail, aviation and government facilities.

2015—Thornton Tomasetti and Weidlinger merge: Thornton Tomasetti and Weidlinger Associates announced a merger. Weidlinger Associates was a U.S.-based structural engineering firm that designed and rehabilitated buildings, bridges, and infrastructure and provided special services in applied science, forensics, and physical security. The merger created two new entities: CORE Lab - a sister internal group to CORE studio - that focuses on the long-term development of internal methods, capabilities and products to evaluate new business opportunities; and TTWiiN, a technology accelerator and product commercialization platform.

Projects

Skyscrapers, buildings and structures
 1111 South Wabash, Chicago
 110 North Wacker, Chicago
 181 West Madison, Chicago
 191 North Wacker, Chicago
 30 Hudson Street, Jersey City, New Jersey
 30 West Oak, Chicago
 401 East Ontario, Chicago
 420 Fifth Avenue, New York
 5 Times Square, New York
 546 Fifth Avenue, New York
 55 East Erie, Chicago
 550 West Jackson, Chicago
 599 Lexington Avenue, New York
 717 Texas Avenue, Houston, Texas
 745 Seventh Avenue, New York
 840 North Lake Shore Drive, Chicago
 855 Avenue Of The Americas, New York
 20 Grosvenor Square, London 
 ABN AMRO Plaza, Chicago
 AMA Building, Chicago
 Americas Tower, New York
 Block A & Block C, MGM CityCenter – "Project CityCenter", Las Vegas, Nevada
 Block 21, Austin, Texas
 Bloomberg Tower, 731 Lexington Avenue, New York
 CBS 2 Broadcast Center, Chicago
 Chase Center, Chicago
 Chifley Tower, Sydney, Australia
 Children's Museum of Los Angeles, Los Angeles
 Citicorp Center, Chicago, Illinois
 City View Tower, Chicago, Illinois
 Conrad Chicago Hotel, Chicago
 Comcast Tower, Philadelphia
 Continental Center, New York
 Deep Space Auditorium, Verona, Wisconsin
 Embassy Suites, New York
 Erie on the Park, Chicago
 Eurasia Tower, Moscow
 Federation Tower, Moscow
 Fifty South Sixth, Minneapolis
 Furman Hall, New York
 Great American Tower at Queen City Square, Cincinnati
 Harborside Financial Center Plaza 5 & Plaza 10, Jersey City, New Jersey
 Hilton New Orleans Riverside, New Orleans
 Kingsbury on the Park, Chicago
 Lehman Brothers Building, New York
 Leo Burnett Building, Chicago
 Lotte Center Hanoi, Hanoi, Vietnam
 McMahon Hall of Fordham University, New York
 Menara Maxis, Kuala Lumpur, Malaysia
 Metapolis, Hwaseong, South Korea
 Minneapolis Central Library, Minneapolis
 Miranova Condominiums, Columbus, Ohio
 Modern Art Museum of Fort Worth, Fort Worth, Texas
 New York Times Building, New York
 One Indiana Square, Indianapolis
 One Liberty Place, Philadelphia
 One Mellon Bank Center, Pittsburgh
 One Pennsylvania Plaza, Philadelphia
 Optima Horizons, Evanston, Illinois
 Optima Towers, Evanston, Illinois
 Overture Center, Madison, Wisconsin
 Palazzo Lombardia, Milan, Italy
 Park Alexandria, Chicago
 Petronas Towers, Kuala Lumpur, Malaysia
 Plaza 66, Shanghai, PRC
 Prentice Women's Hospital, Chicago
 R R Donnely Building, Chicago
 Random House World Headquarters, New York
 Taipei 101, Taipei, Taiwan
 Tencent Headquarters, Shenzhen, China
 The Clare at Water Tower, Chicago
 The Edge, Brooklyn, New York
 The Westport, New York
 The Plaza at PPL Center, Allentown, Pennsylvania
 Times Square Tower, New York
 UBS Tower, Chicago, Illinois
 University of Chicago Graduate School of Business Building, Chicago, Illinois
 We've the Zenith, Busan, South Korea
 Westin Hotel at Copley Place, Boston
 Wilshire Grand Tower, Los Angeles
 Winspear Opera House, Dallas

Stadiums and convention centers

 American Airlines Arena, Miami
 Arvest Ballpark. Springdale, Arkansas
 Al-Najaf International Stadium, Najaf, Iraq
 AT&T Park, San Francisco
 Baku National Stadium, Baku, Azerbaijan
 Banc of California Stadium, Los Angeles, California
 Barclays Center, Brooklyn, New York
 Basra Sports City, Basra, Iraq
 BMO Field, Toronto, Canada
 BOK Center, Tulsa, Oklahoma
 Bridgestone Arena, Nashville, Tennessee
 Children's Mercy Park, Kansas City, Kansas
 Climate Pledge Arena, Seattle, Washington 
 CONSOL Energy Center, Pittsburgh
 Ford Center, Evansville, Indiana
 Ford Field, Detroit, Michigan
 Golden 1 Center, Sacramento, California
 Honda Center, Anaheim, California
 Jeju World Cup Stadium, Seogwipo, South Korea
 Kohl Center, Madison, Wisconsin
 MetLife Stadium, East Rutherford, New Jersey
 Nationals Park, Washington, D.C.
 Nationwide Arena, Columbus, Ohio
 Pepsi Center, Denver
 Petco Park, San Diego
 Philips Arena, Atlanta
 PNC Park, Pittsburgh
 Prudential Center, Newark, New Jersey
 Rogers Place, Edmonton, Canada
 Soldier Field, Chicago
 United Center, Chicago
 U.S. Cellular Field, Chicago
 U.S. Bank Stadium, Minneapolis
 Videotron Centre, Quebec City
 Yankee Stadium, New York

Renewal and rehabilitation
 Chrysler Building – Facade Rehabilitation, New York
 United States Capitol dome – Structural Rehabilitation, Washington, D.C.
 Washington Monument Renovation, Washington, D.C.
 Winter Garden Reconstruction – Structural Repairs, New York
 Wrigley Field – Structural Rehabilitation & Addition, Chicago

Forensics, investigation and property loss consulting
 i-35 bridge collapse, Minneapolis, Minnesota
 Indiana State Fair stage collapse
 Miller Park investigation, Milwaukee, Wisconsin
 Response to CAT-90 Sandy, New York, New Jersey and Connecticut
 Tropicana parking garage collapse, Atlantic City, New Jersey
 World Trade Center disaster response, New York

Under construction
 151 Incheon Tower, Incheon, South Korea
 Baha Mar, The Bahamas
 Comcast Innovation and Technology Center, Philadelphia, Pennsylvania
 Diamond of Istanbul, Istanbul, Turkey
 Jeddah Tower, Jeddah, Saudi Arabia
 Moscow International Business Center Lot 13, Moscow
 Museum of the Built Environment, Riyadh, Saudi Arabia
 One Broadway Plaza, Santa Ana, California
 Pingan International Finance Center, Shenzhen, China
 San Francisco Transbay Terminal, San Francisco
 Shanghai Tower, Shanghai, China
 Signature Tower Jakarta, Jakarta, Indonesia
 SOCAR Tower, Baku, Azerbaijan

Affiliated organizations
  Thornton Tomasetti Foundation - The Thornton Tomasetti Foundation, a tax-exempt, nonprofit organization established in February 2008, is focused on funding fellowships, scholarships and internships for undergraduate students and those planning to pursue graduate studies in building engineering, design or technology. It also provides financial support for individuals and organizations pursuing philanthropic activities related to building engineering, design or technology.
  TTWiiN – TTWiiN, an innovation accelerator, was formed following the merger of Thornton Tomasetti and Weidlinger Associates in 2015. TTWiiN identify technologies and products that have commercial applicability and appeal for a broad audience across many industries.
  ACE Mentorship - Charlie Thornton founded The ACE Mentor Program, which is a not-for-profit organization, formed to enlighten and motivate students toward architecture, construction, engineering, and related careers by providing mentoring opportunities for future designers and constructors.
  AEC Angels – Thornton Tomasetti is a founding member of this venture fund, which covers seed through Series B + investments in the AEC sector.

Notable alumni

External links
 Thornton Tomasetti Corporate Website
 Thornton Tomasetti Foundation
 ACE Mentor Program

References

Construction and civil engineering companies of the United States
Construction and civil engineering companies established in 1956
Companies based in New York City
1956 establishments in New York (state)
2015 mergers and acquisitions